Rafiq Sabir (born in 1950) is a contemporary Kurdish poet. 

He was born in Qaladzê in Iraqi Kurdistan. In 1974, he received Bachelor of Arts degree from Baghdad University. He moved to Sweden in 1989. He writes in the sorani dialect. He belongs to the post-Abdulla Goran generation of modernists in Kurdish poetry.

Works
Karwansara, 146 pp., Uppsala, 1990. 
Towards history : a short ideological historical study, 129 pp., Uppsala, 1991.
Werze berdine, 39 pp., Uppsala  1992. 
Awêne û sêber : Komele honrawe, 88 pp., Arzan Publishers, Jönköping, 1996.  .
Impiratoryayî lam : derbarey îslam, xêl û nasyonalîzm, 230 pp., Rabûn Publishers, Uppsala, 1998. . 
Rûnbûnewe : honrawe, 111 pp.,  Rabûn Publishers, Uppsala, 2001.  .

References

External links
Rafiq Sabir, Immigrant-institutet (in Swedish)

Kurdish poets
Kurdish people
1950 births
Living people
University of Baghdad alumni